Tahsin Ali Abdulaziz, also known as Tahsin Mullah Ali, or Haji Tahsin, was a Kurdish jihadist and one of the four sons of Ali Abdulaziz Halabji, the former leader of the Kurdistan Islamic Movement.

Early life 
Since the age of four, Tahsin Mullah had Islamic education in Halabja, at a school that was established by his family in the 1960s. He was a Salafi since his childhood. He memorized the entire Quran, and also memorized both Sahih Muslim and Sahih al-Bukhari, which contain about 10,000 hadith. He also reportedly had a great voice for reciting the Quran. In 1987, Tahsin fled to Iran with his family and a large number of Kurdish mujahideen. His uncle, Osman Abdulaziz, the founder of the mujahideen, declared jihad against the Ba'ath regime. Tahsin was too young to fight, although he was responsible for taking care of the women in his family in Sanandaj. Tahsin Mullah Ali never shaved his beard ever since he grew it. Hair covered most of his face. His sister stated that "He had Salafi thoughts since childhood. He hated women going out. We always had disagreements. Wherever I went, he would take me and stand in front of me". When Tahsin grew up, he became a Peshmerga soldier. He was reportedly a skilled fighter. Tahsin also traveled to Afghanistan on many occasions. In 1994, he established his own militia called the Martyrs Force, based in Tawila area of ​​Avroman. Soon Tahsin Mullah Ali controlled Tawila and much of Hawraman and began to implement Sharia according to his own interpretation. Jalal Talabani was worried about Tahsin's behavior, and he made him an offer that if he came to Sulaymaniyah, a house, land, money and a car, would be provided for him, all paid for by Jalal Talabani, but Tahsin rejected the offer. In 1999, Tahsin married the daughter of Ahmadi Kaka Mahmood, a prominent leader of the Kurdistan Islamic Movement. In 2002 they had a son and in 2005 they had twins. For their honeymoon, they traveled to Ichkeria to fight the Russian army. He then traveled to Afghanistan again on his own, where he met Osama bin Laden, Ayman al-Zawahiri and Abu Qatada. Diler Abdullah, a Kurdish journalist, met Tahsin Mullah Ali in Tawila in the spring of 2001, he said his office was a simple room on the Iran–Iraq border. He stated that Tahsin was welcoming and talkative. Tahsin got up to greet the guests and poured water for them himself. His father wanted him to become the leader of the Kurdistan Islamic Movement, although Tahsin refused because he did not want to be a part of the Kurdistan Regional Government alongside the secular parties.

Jihad 
When many Kurdish Islamic groups visited Afghanistan in the late 1990s and met with jihadist leaders, only one group was willing to become part of Al-Qaeda. That group was Tahsin's group. During his stay in Iran, Tahsin formed a jihadist group known as "Sons of Salahuddin". After moving to Afghanistan, he married the daughter of a local Pashtun tribal chief. Tahsin had a son with the Pashtun woman. At the request of the woman's father, the child was named Abdulaziz. The whereabouts of the Sons of Saladin are still unknown, but they are active on social networks and have a channel in Kurdish and Farsi on Telegram. Before his assassination, Tahsin wrote a 42-page book called "Baydakhnama", which served as the group's constitution and explained his views on political, legal, Kurdish, Islamic, and social issues. The difference between Sons of Salahuddin and the Kurdistan Brigades in their contact with al-Qaeda was that the Sons of Salahuddin had direct contact with Al-Qaeda, but the Kurdistan Brigades only had contacts with Al-Qaeda through Al-Qaeda affiliated organizations in Iraq. Tahsin's group had sent its members to al-Qaeda-controlled areas in the FATA and Afghanistan long before the Kurdistan Brigades even participated in jihad.

Death 
On the first day of Ramadan, which was on August 1, 2011, a US drone strike on South Waziristan District killed Tahsin. Tahsin's killing made no news in the Kurdistan Region, his family held only two days of funerals in Halabja and Sulaymaniyah, and the media treated the death as an unimportant event. Pakistani intelligence agencies helped the US intelligence against the al-Qaeda and Taliban groups in South Waziristan, the most dangerous place in the world at the time.  The spokesman of the Kurdistan Islamic Movement confirmed the killing of Tahsin Mullah Ali in a speech.

References 

ku:Tehsîn Elî Ebdulezîz
ckb:تەحسین مەلا عەلی